Howlader - Pronounced as (How-la-der) is a surname native to Bangladesh and the United Kingdom. The surname is also shown in West Germany.

Notable people with this surname include:

 A.B.M. Ruhul Amin Howlader, Bangladeshi politician
  Mujibur Rahman Howlader, Bangladeshi politician
 Lawrence Subrata Howlader, Bangladeshi Roman Catholic bishop

References

 

Surnames of English origin